Ronnie Quillian (November 27, 1934 - January 9, 2016) was a former Canadian football player who played for the Ottawa Rough Riders. He played college football at Tulane University.

References

1934 births
2016 deaths
People from Troy, Alabama
Players of American football from Alabama
American players of Canadian football
Tulane Green Wave football players
Ottawa Rough Riders players
Canadian football running backs
Canadian football punters